Naseema Mohamed (also known as Masodi Naseema Kaleygefaanu) was the former First Lady of the Maldives (1968–1978) and the third wife of former President Ibrahim Nasir. After Ibrahim Nasir went into self-exile to Singapore on 7 December 1978, Naseema continued to live in Male' and worked as a historian for the National Centre for Linguistic and Historic Research. She has written extensively on early Maldivian history and the Dhivehi language. She had also previously worked as a nurse. Currently working for Dhivehi Bahuge Academy.  She worked at the Maldives National Museum, retiring in 2011.  She received the National Exemplary Service Medal in 2011.

References

First ladies of the Maldives
People from Malé
1940 births
Living people